Keyshawn Strachan,  (born 18 December 2003) is a Bahamian track and field athlete who competes in the javelin throw. 

Strachan holds the Bahamian javelin throw national record set in Kingston, Jamaica at the 2022 CARIFTA Games with a throw of 79.89 m. 

Strachan also holds the CARIFTA Games Record in the under 18 and under 20 category. He also competed at the 2021 World Athletics U20 Championships in Nairobi, Kenya.

See also
 List of javelin throwers

References

External links
World Athletics Bio

2003 births
Living people
Sportspeople from Nassau, Bahamas
Bahamian javelin throwers